Sibiri Arnaud Sanou (born 5 June 1998) is a Burkinabé professional footballer who plays as a midfielder for Elite One club Coton Sport and the Burkina Faso national team.

Club career 
Sanou began his career at ASF Bobo Dioulasso, a club in his hometown of Bobo-Dioulasso. He signed for Coton Sport in 2019. Sanou scored three goals and provided two assists in fifteen matches in the 2020–21 CAF Confederation Cup.

International career 
Sanou made his debut for the Burkina Faso national team in a 1–0 friendly loss to Uzbekistan on 24 August 2016. After four years with no appearances, he made his return to play for the national team in 2021.

Honours 
ASF Bobo Dioulasso

 Burkinabé Premier League: 2017–18

Coton Sport

 Elite One: 2020–21

Notes

References

External links 

 

1998 births
Living people
People from Bobo-Dioulasso
Burkinabé footballers
Association football midfielders
ASF Bobo Dioulasso players
Coton Sport FC de Garoua players
Burkinabé Premier League players
Elite One players
Burkina Faso international footballers
Burkinabé expatriate footballers
Expatriate footballers in Cameroon
Burkinabé expatriate sportspeople in Cameroon
21st-century Burkinabé people